Jim Kirwan died in the Irish War of Independence in January 1921.

Kirwan was a native of Balliastack, Corofin, County Galway. He was working in a field with a horse and cart, near his father.

Upon hearing some shots, Kirwan's father ran to the site to find a large number of uniformed men around his son's body. They informed him that they had shot Jim in the act of running away, a short time after an ambush at Kilroe and that the victim was thought to resemble a participant in the ambush.

See also
 William Ó Ciardhubháin
 Frank Shawe-Taylor
 Michael Griffin (Irish priest)

References
 The History and Folklore of the Barony of Clare, Michael J. Hughes, c. 1993.

1921 deaths
Deaths by firearm in Ireland
People from County Galway
People killed in the Irish War of Independence
People murdered in Ireland
Irish murder victims
Unsolved murders in Ireland
Year of birth missing
1920s murders in Ireland
1921 murders in Europe
1921 crimes in Ireland